The Land of Frankincense is a site in Oman on the Incense Road. The site includes frankincense trees, Khor Rori and the remains of a caravan oasis, which were crucial to the medieval incense trade.

The site was declared a UNESCO World Heritage Site in 2000 as Frankincense Trail and was renamed in 2005 to Land of Frankincense.

See also
 Museum of the Land of Frankincense

References

External links

UNESCO Frankincense Trail Site
 The Land of Frankincense guide book 
 Frankincense Trail in Oman article

Geography of Oman
World Heritage Sites in Oman
Trade routes
Archaeological sites in Oman	
 

vi:Con đường hương liệu